Gary Puckett & The Union Gap's Greatest Hits is a compilation album by American pop band Gary Puckett & The Union Gap, released in 1970. The album was certified Platinum, selling well over a million copies in the United States alone.  It peaked at #50 on the Billboard album chart.

The song "Let's Give Adam and Eve Another Chance" was released in March 1970 and hit #41 on the Billboard Hot 100 as well as #16 on the Adult contemporary chart.  This was the last album by the band that contained a charting single.

Track listing

Track information and credits verified from the album's liner notes.

Charts

Singles

References

1970 greatest hits albums
Columbia Records compilation albums
Gary Puckett & The Union Gap albums